Marko Dimitrijević (born 8 February 1978) is a Serbian professional basketball coach and former player who is the head coach for Sloga of the Basketball League of Serbia.

Playing career 
During his playing days a guard, Dimitrijević played for his hometown teams Sloga and Mašinac, as well as Srem, Partizan, Igokea (Bosnia and Herzegovina), Pardubice (Czech Republic), Gaz Metan Mediaș (Romania), Feni Industries (Macedonia), Tamiš, and Smederevo 1953. Dimitrijevic retired as a player with Smederevo in 2013.

Coaching career 
After retirement in 2013, Dimitrijević became the head coach for Polet, a club based in Ratina near his hometown, of the First Regional League of Serbia. Afterward, Dimitrijević had coached Mladost SP before he signed with Novi Pazar on 27 June 2017. In December 2017, he parted ways with Novi Pazar. 

Dimitrijević was an assistant coach for the Serbian men's university basketball team at the 2017 Summer Universiade in Taipei. The Serbia squad lost to Latvia in the bronze medal game.

In September 2018, Dimitrijević was hired as the new head coach for Zdravlje. 

In August 2020, Dimitrijević became the head coach for Kolubara LA 2003 of the Basketball League of Serbia.

References

External links
 Coach Profile at eurobasket.com
 Player Profile at proballers.com
 Player Profile at eurobasket.com

1978 births
Living people
Guards (basketball)
KK Igokea players
KK Mašinac players
KK Partizan players
KK Sloga coaches
KK Sloga players
KK Smederevo players
KK Srem players
KK Tamiš players
OKK Konstantin players
KK Zdravlje coaches
KK Mladost SP coaches
KK Kolubara coaches
OKK Novi Pazar coaches
Serbian expatriate basketball people in Bosnia and Herzegovina
Serbian expatriate basketball people in Lebanon
Serbian expatriate basketball people in North Macedonia
Serbian expatriate basketball people in the Czech Republic
Serbian expatriate basketball people in Romania
Serbian men's basketball coaches
Serbian men's basketball players
Sportspeople from Kraljevo